Svedala (outdatedly ; is a locality and the seat of Svedala Municipality, Skåne County, Sweden with 10,627 inhabitants in 2010.

References 

Populated places in Svedala Municipality
Populated places in Skåne County
Municipal seats of Skåne County
Swedish municipal seats
Populated places in the Øresund Region